Ultraviolet astronomy is the observation of electromagnetic radiation at ultraviolet wavelengths between approximately 10 and 320 nanometres; shorter wavelengths—higher energy photons—are studied by X-ray astronomy and gamma-ray astronomy. Ultraviolet light is not visible to the human eye. Most of the light at these wavelengths is absorbed by the Earth's atmosphere, so observations at these wavelengths must be performed from the upper atmosphere or from space.

Overview
Ultraviolet line spectrum measurements (spectroscopy) are used to discern the chemical composition, densities, and temperatures of the interstellar medium, and the temperature and composition of hot young stars. UV observations can also provide essential information about the evolution of galaxies. They can be used to discern the presence of a hot white dwarf or main sequence companion in orbit around a cooler star.

The ultraviolet universe looks quite different from the familiar stars and galaxies seen in visible light.
Most stars are actually relatively cool objects emitting much of their electromagnetic radiation in the visible or near-infrared part of the spectrum. Ultraviolet radiation is the signature of hotter objects, typically in the early and late stages of their evolution. In the Earth's sky seen in ultraviolet light, most stars would fade in prominence. Some very young massive stars and some very old stars and galaxies, growing hotter and producing higher-energy radiation near their birth or death, would be visible. Clouds of gas and dust would block the vision in many directions along the Milky Way.

Space-based solar observatories such as SDO and SOHO use ultraviolet telescopes (called AIA and EIT, respectively) to view activity on the Sun and its corona. Weather satellites such as the GOES-R series also carry telescopes for observing the Sun in ultraviolet.

The Hubble Space Telescope and FUSE have been the most recent major space telescopes to view the near and far UV spectrum of the sky, though other UV instruments have flown on smaller observatories such as GALEX, as well as sounding rockets and the Space Shuttle.

Pioneers in ultraviolet astronomy include George Robert Carruthers, Robert Wilson, and Charles Stuart Bowyer.

Ultraviolet space telescopes

 - Far Ultraviolet Camera/Spectrograph on Apollo 16 (April 1972)
 + ESRO - TD-1A (135-286 nm; 1972–1974)
 - Orbiting Astronomical Observatory (#2:1968-73. #3:1972-1981)
 - Orion 1 and Orion 2 Space Observatories (#1: 200-380 nm, 1971; #2: 200-300 nm, 1973)
 +  - Astronomical Netherlands Satellite (150-330 nm, 1974–1976)
 +  - International Ultraviolet Explorer (115-320 nm, 1978–1996)
 - Astron-1 (150-350 nm, 1983–1989)
 - Glazar 1 and 2 on Mir (in Kvant-1, 1987–2001)
 - EUVE (7-76 nm, 1992–2001)
 - FUSE (90.5-119.5 nm, 1999–2007)
 +  - Extreme ultraviolet Imaging Telescope (on SOHO imaging Sun at 17.1, 19.5, 28.4, and 30.4 nm)
 +  - Hubble Space Telescope (various 115-800 nm,1990-1997-) (STIS 115–1030 nm, 1997–) (WFC3 200-1700 nm, 2009–)
 - Swift Gamma-Ray Burst Mission (170–650 nm, 2004- )
 - Hopkins Ultraviolet Telescope (flew in 1990 and 1995)
 - ROSAT XUV (17-210eV) (30-6 nm, 1990–1999)
 - Far Ultraviolet Spectroscopic Explorer (90.5-119.5 nm, 1999–2007)
 - Galaxy Evolution Explorer (135–280 nm, 2003–2012)
 - Hisaki  (130-530 nm, 2013 -)
 - Lunar-based ultraviolet telescope (LUT)  (on Chang'e 3 lunar lander, 245-340  nm, 2013 -)
 - Astrosat  (130-530 nm, 2015 -)
 - Colorado Ultraviolet Transit Experiment (CUTE) - (255-330 nm spectrograph, 2021- )
 - Public Telescope (PST) (100-180 nm, Proposed 2015, EU funded study )
 - Viewpoint-1 SpaceFab.US (200-950 nm, Launch planned 2022)

See also List of ultraviolet space telescopes

Ultraviolet instruments on planetary spacecraft
 - UVIS (Cassini) - 1997 (at Saturn from 2004 to 2017)
 - MASCS (MESSENGER) - 2004 (at Mercury from 2011 to 2015)
 - Alice (New Horizons) - 2006 (Pluto flyby in 2015)
 - UVS (Juno) - 2011 (at Jupiter since 2016)
 - IUVS (MAVEN) - 2013 (at Mars since 2014)

See also

References

External links

 
Astronomical imaging
Astronomical sub-disciplines
Astronomy